The Women's rhythmic gymnastics individual all-around competition at the 2015 European Games was held in the National Gymnastics Arena, Baku on 19 June 2015.

Results

References 

Gymnastics at the 2015 European Games
2015 in women's gymnastics